Javor Stadium is a multi-purpose stadium in Ivanjica, Serbia. It is currently used mostly for football matches and is the home ground of FK Javor Ivanjica. The stadium holds 3,000 people.

History
In the summer of 2019, the stadium underwent minor reconstruction as part of preparations for start of 2019–20 Serbian SuperLiga season.

Gallery

References

Ivanjica
Multi-purpose stadiums in Serbia